Rita Clay Estrada (born July 31, 1941, in Michigan, US) is a US writer of romance novels as Rita Clay, Tira Lacy and Rita Clay Estrada, she has also written non-fiction books about writing romance novels. She was the first president of the Romance Writers of America, and founding member with her mother Rita Gallagher.

Biography
Born Rita Clay on July 31, 1941, in Michigan, US.  Her mother, Rita Gallagher, was a former Miss Michigan, a romance novelist and a noted writing instructor, while her father was a pilot with the U.S. Air Force.  She spent much of her early years living in Europe.  She married her high school sweetheart when she was very young and stayed at home to raise their four children.  In 1977, when she had been married about 20 years, her husband brought her a typewriter and said, "'You said you always wanted to write.  Now write.'"

Her first attempt was a long historical romance which was promptly rejected.  Her next manuscript, a contemporary romance, was likewise rejected.  Her third manuscript, Wanderer's Dream, sold to Silhouette Books.  She used her maiden name, Rita Clay for that and an additional seven titles for Silhouette.  In 1982, she moved to Dell to write for their Candlelight Ecstasy line.  Harlequin owned her pen name, so she wrote as Tira Lacy, an anagram of Rita Clay.  In 1985 she re-signed with Harlequin and asked to use her full name, Rita Clay Estrada, on all future books.

She generally takes 4.5 months to write a novel.  Except for punctuation and fact-checking, she does very little rewriting, as "that's why there are editors." Generally, she writes five pages each night and more on the weekends.  Her novels have been translated in 23 languages.

Estrada was a founding member and the first president of the Romance Writers of America (RWA).  Their signature award, the RITA, which is the highest award of excellence given in the genre of romantic fiction, is named for her. The RWA also awarded Estrada their Lifetime Achievement Award in 2000.

She and her husband are divorced.

Works

Novels

As Rita Clay

Single novels
Wanderer's Dream (1981)
Sweet Eternity (1982)
Yesterday's Dreams (1982)
Experiment in Love (1983)
Summer Song (1983)

Wise Folly Series
Wise Folly (1982)
Recapture the Love (1984)

Omnibus in collaboration
Visible Heart / Handyman Special / Wanderer's Dream (1992) (with Dixie Browning, Pamela Browning)

As Tira Lacy

Single novels
With time and tenderness (1983)
Only for love (1984)

As Rita Clay Estrada

Will and the Way Series
Will and the Way (1985)
A Woman's Choice (1985)
Something to Treasure (1986)

Western Lovers: Ranchin' Dads Series Multi-Author
15. The Best Things in Life (1986)

Montclair Emeralds Multi-Author
3. Trust (1988)

Bartholomew Family Saga
Second to None (1989)
The Lady Says No (1991)

Lost Loves Series Multi-Author
3. Forms of Love (1994)

The Wrong Bed Series Multi-Author
4. Love Me, Love My Bed (1996)

Rebels & Rogues Multi-Author
The Stormchaser (1996)

Gallagher Sisters Saga
Wishes (1997)
Dreams (1998)
Everything About Him (1998)

Bachelor Auction Series Multi-Author
One Wild Weekend (1999)

Single novels
The Ivory Key (1987)
A Little Magic (1987)
To Buy a Groom (1990)
Twice Loved (1991)
One More Time (1993)
The Colonel's Daughter (1993)
Interlude in Time (1994)
The Twelve Gifts of Christmas (1994)
Million Dollar Valentine (2000)
Blissful (2000)
Too Wicked to Love (2001)

Omnibus in collaboration
To Have and to Hold (1992) (with Sandra James, Debbie Macomber and Barbara Bretton)
Conveniently Yours (1994) (with Sally Bradford and Bobby Hutchinson)
Expecting! (1996) (with Barbara Delinsky and Michelle Reid)
Bedazzled (2002) (with Jayne Ann Krentz and Vicki Lewis Thompson)

Non fiction
Writing Romances (1997) (with Rita Gallagher)
You Can Write a Romance (1999) (with Rita Gallagher)

See also
List of romantic novelists

References

20th-century American novelists
21st-century American novelists
American romantic fiction writers
Writers of books about writing fiction
Living people
1941 births
American women novelists
Women romantic fiction writers
20th-century American women writers
21st-century American women writers